Matthew Lopez (born October 30, 1989), known professionally as Aston Matthews (stylized as A$ton Matthews), is a Guatemalan-American rapper from Los Angeles, California. In 2014, he began to gain recognition following the release of his second mixtape, A$ton 3:16. Matthews is also a part of the Los Angeles hip-hop trio Cutthroat Boyz alongside fellow Californian rappers Vince Staples and Joey Fatts.

Early life 
Matthew Lopez was born October 30, 1989 in the city of Los Angeles, California. Born of Guatemalan immigrants, Lopez spent much of his formative years between Los Angeles, Hawaiian Gardens, Gardena, and Carson, California. Lopez, a self described multi-sport athlete, played varsity football throughout the duration of his high school career. It is during this time that he became a member of the West Side Pirus, a faction of the Bloods based in Carson, California. On May 31, 2008, Lopez was involved in an altercation at a house party where he was shot in his heart by a .40 caliber bullet, breaking his ribs, and tearing his stomach in the process. After making a full recovery, Lopez began to write and record songs about his life.

Career

2009-11: Career beginnings and NOFVCKSGIVEN 
Following his recovery Lopez would practice writing, rapping, and recording one song a day for two years before releasing his first solo project. On November 4, 2011, Lopez would release "NOFVCKSGIVEN." Lopez described his approach to the project in an interview with VICE as, "I'm just gonna go in on a bunch of beats, make some random crazy shit and see what the fuck happens." NOFVCKSGIVEN largely narrated the events leading up to Lopez's shooting, as well as describing it from his own point of view on the song "May 31st" which also featured then rising rap artist ScHoolboy Q. When he began to rap himself, Lopez primarily studied the flow and musical patterns of Eminem, also citing Jay-Z, Lil Wayne, G-Unit, and The Diplomats as direct influences to his style.

Prior to recording NOFVCKSGIVEN, Lopez would be introduced to Vince Staples through a mutual friend. Staples and Lopez would go on to collaborate on numerous occasions, ultimately appearing together on Lopez's first project. After the release of NOFVCKSGIVEN Staples would introduce Lopez to A$AP Yams who admired Lopez's unique rap style and wanted to further develop him as an artist.

2011-12: Cutthroat Boyz and Versace Ragz 
After forming Cutthroat Boyz with rising west coast rap artist Vince Staples and Joey Fatts, Yams would go on to manage Lopez and oversee his next project entitled "Versace Ragz." The title served as an ode to New Orleans rap legend Juvenile's sophomore album Solja Rags. The project furthermore paid tribute as the cover art featured a hand drawn Lopez in the style of early 1990s New Orleans rap album covers made popular by Cash Money Records.

On August 4, 2012, Lopez would release Versace Ragz. The project featured rising New York artists Da$h, RetcH, and Bodega Bamz, as well as Vince Staples. Three weeks later on August 24, 2012, Lopez would premiere his debut music video 'Triple HHH' the video featured both Staples and Fatts, marking the first appearance together on film as Cutthroat Boyz.

On November 6, 2012, Lopez released a remix to the project's lead single "Mini Van Dan" featuring A$AP Nast, Danny Brown, and Flatbush Zombies. A week later on November 12, 2012, Lopez would release an official video to "Hell in a Cell".

Since Versace Ragz release, Lopez has been regarded as being a pioneer in experimental gangster rap as his subject matter reflected a mixture of gang life and the implementation of WWE Wrestling references. Lopez has often referred to himself in song as several monikers in homage to wrestlers including; Brick Flair, his most popular moniker in tribute to Ric Flair, Mini Van Dan, in tribute to Rob Van Dam, Big Poppa Pump, in tribute to Scott Steiner, Eddie Guerrero's Hologram, in tribute to the late Eddie Guerrero, and Latino Heat, also in tribute to the late Eddie Guerrero.

2013-14: A$ton 3:16 and Touring 
Following the success of Versace Ragz, Lopez would join A$AP Rocky on the European leg of his Live.Love.A$AP Tour in May 2013. Lopez was then announced to make a feature appearance on A$AP Ferg's debut album Trap Lord before joining his first nationwide tour 'Turnt x Burnt' as a supporting act the following Fall.

On January 16, 2013, Lopez sold out his first show at The Roxy alongside Staples and Fatts, marking the group's first performance and appearance together on stage as The Cutthroat Boyz.

On May 1, 2013, Lopez released an official video to "Mack 11," also announcing he was currently working with legendary hip-hop producers Alchemist and Evidence (of Dilated Peoples).

In June 2013, it was announced Lopez was working on a new project entitled 'A$ton 3:16' which he would describe as a departure from his former projects, "Showcasing [my] rap ability across the board." In an interview with HipHopDX, Lopez described his experience with both producers as,

On October 3, 2013, it was revealed Lopez would appear on the soundtrack of Grand Theft Auto V via the song 'R-Cali' alongside A$AP Rocky.

Two weeks later on October 16, 2013, Lopez released an official video to "Like This" the video quickly became a viral sensation garnering over 500,000 YouTube views upon release.

On December 16, 2013, Lopez released an official video to "Free Wavy Crockett II" an official followup to "Free Wavy Crockett" off his NOFVCKSGIVEN project, both songs and video pay homage to incarcerated New York rap artist Max B whom frequently went by the moniker 'Wavy Crockett'.

On January 29, 2014, Lopez debuted a single off the project entitled 'T.L.C.' which featured Action Bronson, Flatbush Zombies, and A$AP Yams. The song is Lopez's most streamed song on SoundCloud to date, garnering over 1,000,000 streams to date.

On February 10, 2014, Lopez released an official video to "Praey". Two weeks later on February 24, 2014, released an official video to "What You Need" directed by 2015 MTV Video Music Award Director Andrew Hines, the video features a cameo by A$AP Rocky.

On February 20, 2014, Yams tweeted a flyer confirming Lopez's appearance at SXSW Music Festival, one month later on March 14, 2014, Yams would post footage of Lopez performing a verse over an early version of A$AP Mob's single "Hella Hoes",  to his Tumblr. Lopez would later perform his verse in its entirety alongside the group at SXSW's House of Vans stage sponsored by Vibe Magazine and Vans.

On March 16, 2014, Lopez released A$ton 3:16 via Soundcloud. The title acted as an ode to WWE Wrestler Stone Cold Steve Austin, and featured 19 songs in total. The album's cover art pays homage to Ice Cube's Death Certificate, Lopez has said in interviews his father was an Ice Cube fan and frequently played his albums growing up. Executive produced by both Yams and Chace Infinite, the project featured production by Evidence, Alchemist, Jay Curry and Dj Khalil, as well as guest appearances by Action Bronson, Ab-Soul, Flatbush Zombies, A$AP Ferg, Vince Staples, and Bodega Bamz.

On May 2, 2014 Lopez joined Danny Brown's OLD Tour, making his first appearance at University of California, San Diego.

On July 7, 2014, Lopez released an official video to "Lit". Nearly two months later on August 27, 2014, Lopez released an official video to "The Other Side" featuring Kap G. Both song and videos have been released as non-album promotional singles.

On September 9, 2014, during an interview with XXL Magazine, Vince Staples announced Lopez would be one of two features alongside Teyana Taylor on his upcoming "Hell Can Wait" EP. Lopez would later make a cameo performing an interlude in the music video of Staple's lead single, "Screen Door."

One month later on December 10, 2014, Lopez appeared alongside Young Thug on Noisey's Rap Monument, a 42-Minute song consisting of over 40 rappers including Raekwon, Pusha T, Nipsey Hussle, Danny Brown, and YG among others. Noisey, the music division of Vice Magazine, regarded Lopez as, "West coast gangsta rap's best kept secret."

2015-16: Yams Passing and Hiatus 
On August 28, 2015 in an interview with XXL Magazine, Lopez revealed that he was with Yams the evening of his passing. Stating he flew to New York to pitch himself for the 2015 XXL Freshman Class, he spent time working with Yams on an unreleased project before ultimately witnessing his passing January 18, 2015. Lopez spoke of his hiatus and the impact of Yams untimely passing as,

After a hiatus from social media, on April 1, 2015, Lopez released an official video to "Chapo" featuring Vince Staples. The video quickly became Lopez's most watched music video with over 1,000,000 YouTube views to date. Lopez is seen wearing a T-shirt honoring Yams throughout.

On May 2, 2015, Lopez would return to London for the first time in two years to perform, selling out the legendary 100 Club alongside frequent collaborator Da$h. Upon his return to the United States May 30, 2015, Lopez would go on to sell out Los Angeles' Los Globos alongside frequent collaborator Bodega Bamz.

On June 30, 2015, it was revealed Lopez would appear on Vince Staples Summertime '06 album. Lopez was praised by Complex Magazine for his guest appearance as well as being credited the "Best voice in the rap game." Lopez also appears in the music video of the album's lead single "Senorita".

In Lopez's August 28, 2015 interview with XXL Magazine he explained overcoming depression following Yams passing, and announced working with New York producer Velous on his upcoming project entitled "Chapovelli." Lopez described the project's conception as,   

On October 19, 2015, Lopez would perform at The Novo in Los Angeles at Young Thug's Hy!£UN35 Tour. A month later on December 13, 2015, Lopez would join Vince Staples on his Summertime '06 Tour.

On December 21, 2015 in celebration of the life and legacy of Yams, the ASAP Mob announced Lopez would perform at the first annual Yams Day Music Festival at Terminal 5 in New York City on January 18, 2016. Lopez would go on to perform at the second annual Yams Day Music Festival at Madison Square Garden in New York City the following January 18, 2017.

On April 26, 2016 in part of the Wavy Wednesday series, ASAP Mob released a remix version of 'Hella Hoes' featuring Lopez and Danny Brown in addition to the group's original verses on both SoundCloud and YouTube. Lopez performed his verse three years prior at The House of Vans Stage at SXSW alongside the group, as well as on a leaked video version posted by Yams the week of the performance.

On August 22, 2016 Lopez joined OG Maco's nationwide T.L.C. Tour.

On October 18, 2016, Lopez released 'Coldest Night In Hell' Produced by Velous, the song heavily samples Ghostface Killah's 2000 song 'Mighty Healthy' and details the events of '100 Days, 100 Nights' a period of sustained gang warfare in retaliation to the death of a 27-year-old man in Los Angeles in the summer of 2015.

2017-Present: Resurgence and Chapovelli 
On June 20, 2017, in an Instagram post celebrating the life and legacy of the late rap artist Prodigy of the Queensbridge rap duo Mobb Deep, Lopez revealed they had recorded an unreleased collaboration 'months' prior to his passing. On January 30, 2018, Billboard premiered the posthumous collaboration entitled, '1 Minute To Pray.' In an interview with Billboard, the collaboration is described by Lopez as,

On September 15, 2017, Lopez announced he would be performing for the first time in Seoul, South Korea at The Henz Club. The performance would mark Lopez's first appearance in an Asian territory. A week later, Lopez announced on September 25, 2017 that a collaboration with up-and-coming producer Pi'erre Bourne was in the works. On November 1, 2017, Lopez premiered the collaboration with hip-hop magazine XXL entitled 'BRAZY' reviving talks of his long-awaited album Chapovelli across the internet. Two weeks later, on November 13, 2017, Lopez debuted a music video for 'BRAZY' citing its release in honor of Yams birthday of which fell on the same day. The music video showcases Lopez's travels throughout Seoul, South Korea.

Personal life 
On the morning of February 9, 2018, Lopez announced the arrival of his first born son.

Lopez is a self-proclaimed fan of The Oakland Raiders, The Los Angeles Lakers, The Los Angeles Dodgers, and The University of Southern California Trojans, frequently making highly opinionated and candid remarks toward each organization across all social media platforms throughout each team's season.

Discography

Studio albums

Mixtapes

Singles

As lead artist

Guest appearances

Awards and nominations

References 

Rappers from Los Angeles
Songwriters from California
American people of Guatemalan descent
Living people
1989 births
Bloods
21st-century American rappers